In biology, the BBCH-scale for cotton describes the phenological development of cotton plants  Gossypium hirsutum using the BBCH-scale.

The phenological growth stages and BBCH-identification keys of cotton are:

1 Leaves are counted from the cotyledon node (= node 0)
2 Side shoot development may occur earlier, if there is a vegetative side shoot continue with principal growth stage 2. If there is a reproductive side shoot (fruiting branch) continue with the principal growth stage 5
3 Vegetative side shoots are counted from the cotyledon node
4 "pin-head square" or "match-head square" is the first square which forms at the first fruiting position of the first fruiting branch

References
 

BBCH-scale